Enos John Thomas (28 April 1892 – 27 March 1974) was an Australian rules footballer who played with Melbourne and Essendon in the Victorian Football League (VFL).

Notes

External links 

1892 births
1974 deaths
Australian rules footballers from Melbourne
Melbourne Football Club players
Essendon Football Club players
People from Ringwood, Victoria